Parliamentary elections were held in Portugal on 18 September 1870.

Results

References

Legislative elections in Portugal
Portugal
1870 in Portugal
September 1870 events